Georgios Kakko (born 18 May 1997) is a professional footballer who plays as a winger for Super League 2 club Iraklis. Born in Albania, he has represented Greece at youth level.

Career
On August 26, 2016 it was announced that Kakko signed a long year season contract with Panserraikos, on loan from PAOK.
A year later, on 1 August 2017 it was announced that Kakko signed a long year season contract with Nea Salamina, on loan from PAOK.

References

External links

1997 births
Living people
Footballers from Elbasan
Albanian footballers
Albanian emigrants to Greece
Association football wingers
Greek footballers
Greece youth international footballers
Greek expatriate footballers
PAOK FC players
Panserraikos F.C. players
Nea Salamis Famagusta FC players
A.E. Karaiskakis F.C. players
Super League Greece players
Football League (Greece) players
Albanian expatriate footballers
Albanian expatriate sportspeople in Greece
Expatriate footballers in Cyprus
Albanian expatriate sportspeople in Cyprus
Enosi Panaspropyrgiakou Doxas players